Jason Kravits (born May 28, 1967) is an American actor. He is best known for portraying A.D.A. Richard Bay on ABC's The Practice.

Early life and education 
Kravits was born in Passaic, New Jersey. In 1975, his family moved to Rockville, Maryland where he later attended Colonel Zadok A. Magruder High School. Kravits attended the University of Maryland, College Park, where in 1986 he co-founded the university's first improv group, Erasable Inc.

Career

Washington, D.C. 
In 1980, while still in middle school, Kravits landed his first professional acting job, playing Lolo Knopke on the short-lived 1982 PBS series Powerhouse. Upon graduation from University of Maryland, Kravits started working in theater in the Washington, D.C. area, performing regularly at the Washington Jewish Theater and Shakespeare Theater as well as The Round House Theater and Woolly Mammoth Theater companies. He was nominated for two Helen Hayes Awards for his performances in “Free Will and Wonton Lust” by Nicky Silver and “All in the Timing” by David Ives.

While living in the DC area, Kravits also appeared in Major League II and Homicide: Life on the Street.

New York City 
In 1995, Kravits moved to New York City, where he began performing with the writer/performer collective “A Rumble in the Redroom.” Over several years, he, along with fellow performer, Joel Hurt Jones, developed enough material to create the two-man musical sketch show, “An Evening with Kravits and Jones.” In 1998, after bringing the show to the famous Improv Comedy Club in Los Angeles, the duo was asked to perform at 1999's HBO Comedy Festival in Aspen, CO, where they took home the Jury Award for Best Sketch Show.

Los Angeles 
In 1999, Kravits moved to Los Angeles, where he started working regularly in TV and film. Later that year, he guest starred on ABC's The Practice as A.D.A. Richard Bay. Kravits became a recurring character during the show's fourth season and a series regular during its fifth. On the show's 100th episode in 2001, Bay was assassinated after refusing to throw a murder trial.<ref>{{Cite web |last=May 11 |first=Mark Harris Updated |last2=EDT |first2=2001 at 04:00 AM |title=Why The Practice''' killed off a major character |url=https://ew.com/article/2001/05/11/why-practice-killed-major-character/ |access-date=2022-08-21 |website=EW.com |language=en}}</ref>

Kravits continued to work in television and film, landing roles in Gilmore Girls, Everybody Loves Raymond, Curb Your Enthusiasm, and the final episode of Friends. He also appeared regularly as a panelist on several game shows, including NBC's Hollywood Squares and CBS's To Tell the Truth.

 Return to New York City 
In 2003, Kravits moved back to New York. In 2003, he made his Broadway debut in Larry Gelbart's play "Sly Fox". In 2006, he originated the role of “Gangster Number 1” alongside his brother, Garth Kravits, who played "Gangster Number 2" in the Tony-winning musical The Drowsy Chaperone, directed by Casey Nicholaw. In 2011 Kravits joined the cast of "Relatively Speaking," three one-act plays by Ethan Coen, Elaine May, and Woody Allen (directed by John Turturro).

In 2015, Kravits developed the solo, improvised cabaret “Off the Top," featuring entirely improvised songs and music derived from audience suggestions. He has performed  the show at the Edinburgh Fringe Festival and Adelaide Cabaret Festival, as well as venues in London, Amsterdam, Melbourne, Washington, D.C., Los Angeles and at the Birdland Theatre in New York. In 2017, the show won a Bistro Award for Best Comedy, and was nominated for a MAC Award in 2021.

Kravits continued to work in television and film, including guest appearances on many Chuck Lorre shows like The Big Bang Theory, Young Sheldon, and B Positive. He provided the voices of Michael Bloomberg, Alan Dershowitz, and others on Our Cartoon President.Kravits has created several viral parody videos, include a Hamilton-inspired song "Harrison," about William Henry Harrison, and “The Kvetch,” an animated parody of Dr. Seuss’s The Grinch.''

Filmography

Film

Television

References

External links 

1967 births
Male actors from Maryland
American male television actors
Living people